Robert Smith (born April 17, 1997) is a professional Canadian football defensive lineman for the Toronto Argonauts of the Canadian Football League (CFL).

University career
Smith played U Sports football with the Wilfrid Laurier Golden Hawks from 2015 to 2018. He was a member of the 2016 Yates Cup championship team and was named an OUA All-Star in 2017 and 2018.

Professional career
Smith was drafted ninth overall in the 2019 CFL Draft by the Toronto Argonauts and signed with the team on May 16, 2019. He made his professional debut on June 22, 2019, against the Hamilton Tiger-Cats. He recorded his first career sack on July 18, 2019, against the Calgary Stampeders' Nick Arbuckle. He later made his first career start on August 16, 2019, against the Edmonton Eskimos. Smith finished his rookie campaign having played in 14 regular season games, starting in four, and recorded 15 defensive tackles, one special teams tackle, four sacks, and one forced fumble. He did not play in 2020 due to the cancellation of the 2020 CFL season.

In 2021, Smith played in all 14 regular season games where he had 24 defensive tackles, six special teams tackles, one sack, and one forced fumble. In 2022, he played in 17 regular season games where he had 22 defensive tackles, seven special teams tackles, three sacks, one interception, and one forced fumble. In the 109th Grey Cup game, Smith had four defensive tackles and one sack, but took a costly facemask penalty that extended the final drive of the game for the Winnipeg Blue Bombers. However, in a measure of redemption, he blocked Winnipeg's potential game-winning field goal and Smith won his first Grey Cup championship.

References

External links
Toronto Argonauts bio

1997 births
Living people
Canadian football defensive linemen
Players of Canadian football from Ontario
Wilfrid Laurier Golden Hawks football players
Sportspeople from Brampton
Toronto Argonauts players